Ilinka Mitreva (11 February 1950 – 1 August 2022) was a Macedonian politician, Minister of Foreign Affairs in 2001 and from 2002 to 2006.

Personal life 

Mitreva was born in Skopje in 1950. Her education after graduating from the Faculty of Philology in Skopje, a group of Romanian philology in 1973, she received her master's degree from the Faculty of Philology in Belgrade and then received her Doctorate from the Faculty of Philology in Skopje.

From 1974 to 2001 she worked as a junior assistant, associate professor and head of the Department of Romanian Languages and Literature at the Faculty of Philology in Skopje. Mitreva was professor of French literature at the Department of Romanian Languages and Literature from 23 November 2001 to 31 October 2002. She was the author of several professional and scientific papers.

Political career 
Mitreva was Minister of Foreign Affairs of Macedonia in two different terms. She was first appointed to that position in May 2001, but resigned in November 2001. However, she was reappointed in November 2002, and held the position until August 2006, when a new government took office after parliamentary elections.

References

1950 births
2022 deaths
Politicians from Skopje
Foreign Ministers of North Macedonia
Female foreign ministers
Women government ministers of North Macedonia
Members of the Assembly of North Macedonia
Social Democratic Union of Macedonia politicians
21st-century Macedonian women politicians
21st-century Macedonian politicians
Macedonian women diplomats
Ss. Cyril and Methodius University of Skopje alumni